Buratsky is a rural locality (a khutor) in Lysovskoye Rural Settlement, Surovikinsky District, Volgograd Oblast, Russia. The population was 556 as of 2010. There are 10 streets.

Geography 
Buratsky is on the right bank of the Liska River, 47 km southeast of Surovikino (the district's administrative centre) by road. Novomaximovsky is the nearest rural locality.

References 

Rural localities in Surovikinsky District